A. melanogaster  may refer to:
 Acheilognathus melanogaster, a ray-finned fish species
 Anhinga melanogaster, the Oriental darter, Indian darter or snakebird, a water bird species of tropical South Asia and Southeast Asia

See also
 Melanogaster (disambiguation)